X Factor Česko a Slovensko is a Czech and Slovak reality television music competition created by Simon Cowell and produced by FremantleMedia, on TV Prima and TV JOJ. Based on the original UK show, and an addition to the X Factor franchise, the series finds new singing talent (solo artists and groups ages 12 and over), drawn from public auditions, and they compete against each other for votes. The winner is determined by the show's viewers SMS text voting, and is awarded a recording contract, worth €200.000 .

The original judging consisted of Celeste Buckingham, Ondřej Brzobohatý, Sisa Sklovská and Oto Klempíř and Martin "Pyco" Rausch as hosts.

Casting was announced in December in the Czech Republic. Prima family serves as the broadcaster for Czech viewers and TV JOJ for Slovaks.

Series overview
To date, three seasons have been broadcast, as summarized below.

 Contestant in (or mentor of) "Boys" category
 Contestant in (or mentor of) "Girls" category
 Contestant in (or mentor of) "Over 28s" category
 Contestant in (or mentor of) "Groups" category

Judges' categories and their contestants
In each season, each judge is allocated a category to mentor and chooses three acts to progress to the live shows. This table shows, for each season, which category each judge was allocated and which acts he or she put through to the live shows.

Key:
 – Winning judge/category. Winners are in bold, eliminated contestants in small font.

References

External links
 Official website Czech Republic
 Official website Slovakia

The X Factor
Czech reality television series
Slovak reality television series
Czech music television series
Slovak music television series
2010s Czech television series
2010s Slovak television series
2014 Czech television series debuts
2014 Slovak television series debuts
Czech television series based on British television series
Slovak television series based on British television series
Prima televize original programming
TV JOJ original programming